Stéphane Mahé (born 23 September 1968) is a French former professional footballer and former manager of Saint Nazaire FC (now Stade Nazairien).

Playing career
Mahé was born in Puteaux. He started his career in the AJ Auxerre youth academy, graduating to the first team under Guy Roux's tutelage in 1989. He suffered a setback when involved in a car accident in 1992, missing six months through resultant injuries. Upon his return in 1993 he helped Auxerre reach the UEFA Cup semifinals, where they lost to Borussia Dortmund when Mahé missed the final penalty. The following year he earned his first winners' medal, as Auxerre defeated Montpellier 3–0 in the Coupe de France final.

Mahé moved to Paris Saint-Germain in 1995, spending a single season in the capital, during which PSG won the Cup-Winners Cup against Rapid Wien in Brussels. He played in both legs of the second round win over his future employers Celtic. After one season with Stade Rennais he left France, joining Scottish Premier League side Celtic in 1997.

In Glasgow, Mahé collected six trophies and was part of the side which ended arch-rivals Rangers run of consecutive championship wins at nine. He spent the last two years of his career with Hearts, scoring twice against Kilmarnock and Aberdeen, before retiring in 2003.

Coaching and managerial career
Mahe worked as manager of lower-league Saint-Nazaire, his home city, between August 2003 and March 2007.

Honours
 Coupe de France: 1994
 Trophée des Champions: 1995
 Scottish Champion: 1997–98, 2000–01
 Scottish Cup: 2001
 Scottish League Cup: 1997–98, 1999–00, 2000–01

References

External links
Appearances at londonhearts.com
Appearances for Celtic at FitbaStats

1968 births
Living people
People from Puteaux
French footballers
Footballers from Hauts-de-Seine
Footballers from Loire-Atlantique
Association football fullbacks
Scottish Premier League players
Scottish Football League players
AJ Auxerre players
Paris Saint-Germain F.C. players
Stade Rennais F.C. players
Celtic F.C. players
Heart of Midlothian F.C. players
French expatriate footballers
French expatriate sportspeople in Scotland
Expatriate footballers in Scotland